On (the) Sizes and Distances (of the Sun and Moon) may refer to:

 On the Sizes and Distances (Aristarchus), by Aristarchus of Samos
 On Sizes and Distances (Hipparchus), by Hipparchus